Slightly Used is a 1927 American comedy film directed by Archie Mayo and written by C. Graham Baker and Jack Jarmuth. The film stars May McAvoy, Conrad Nagel, Robert Agnew, Audrey Ferris, Anders Randolf and Eugenie Besserer. The film was released by Warner Bros. on September 3, 1927.

Cast       
May McAvoy as Cynthia Martin
Conrad Nagel as Major John Smith
Robert Agnew as Donald Woodward
Audrey Ferris as Helen Martin
Anders Randolf as Mr. Martin
Eugenie Besserer as Aunt Lydia
Arthur Rankin as Gerald
David Mir as Horace
Sally Eilers as Grace Martin
Jack Santoro as Harold

References

External links
 

1927 films
1920s English-language films
Silent American comedy films
1927 comedy films
Warner Bros. films
Films directed by Archie Mayo
American silent feature films
American black-and-white films
1920s American films
English-language comedy films